The  is a member of the Cabinet of Japan and is the leader and chief executive of the Ministry of Justice. The minister is nominated by the Prime Minister of Japan and is appointed by the Emperor of Japan.

The current minister is Ken Saitō, who took office on 11 November 2022.

Powers
By law, the Minister of Justice is authorized to order executions of any inmate on death row at anytime, making the position highly influential. The Minister is also authorized to deport or grant any foreigner residential or permanent visas.

List of Ministers of Justice (1952-2000)

List of Ministers of Justice (2001–)

References